Dingzhou, or Tingchow in Postal Map Romanization, and formerly called Ding County or Dingxian, is a county-level city in the prefecture-level city of Baoding, Hebei Province. As of 2009, Dingzhou had a population of 1.2 million. Dingzhou has 3 subdistricts, 13 towns, 8 townships, and 1 ethnic township.

History
Dingzhou was originally known as Lunu in early imperial China. It contained several fragments of Han literature, including manuscripts of Confucius's Analects, the Taoist Wenzi, and the Six Secret Teachings, a military treatise. The identity of the tomb's occupant is unknown, but Chinese archaeologists have speculated that it belonged to Liu Xiu or Xu Xing.

Dingzhou took its present name around 400CE when it became the seat of Ding Prefecture under the Northern Wei, displacing the earlier An Prefecture. In the mid-6th century, its territory held 834,211 people living in 177,500 households. Under the Sui, the seat of Boling Commandery at present-day Anping was renamed "Gaoyang". In 607, Dingzhou then became the eponymous seat of a new Boling commandery and retained that name and status under the Tang until it returned to the name Dingzhou between 621 and 742 and again after 758. Its territory held only 86,869 people in 25,637 households in 639 but recovered to 496,676 people in 78,090 households by 742.

In 1055, under the Song, the city became the home of the  Liaodi Pagoda, which is today China's tallest surviving pre-modern pagoda.

Under the early Republic, it was known as Dingxian (then romanized "Tingsien" or "Ting Hsien") from its status as the seat of Ding County. From 1926 to 1937, the county was the site of the National Association of Mass Education Movement's Ting Hsien Experiment of the Rural Reconstruction Movement. In the 1990s, the New Rural Reconstruction Movement maintained a training and outreach center.

Administrative divisions

Towns:
Qingfengdian, Dongting, Liqingu, Mingyuedian, Daxinzhuang, Xingyi, Zhuanlu, Liuzao, Pangcun, Gaopeng, Ziwei, Dingningdian, Dongwang, Kaiyuan

Townships:
Dongliuchun Township, Zhoucun Township, Daluzhuang Township, Yangjiazhuang Township, Zhaocun Township, Xicheng Township, Xizhong Township, Haotouzhuang Hui Ethnic Township

Climate

Transportation
Dingzhou is one of the transportation hubs in North China.

Railroads
 Jingguang railway: Dingzhou Railway Station
 Jingshi Passenger Railway: Dingzhou East Railway Station
 Shuohuang Railway: Dingzhou South Railway Station

Highways
 Jingshi Expressway
 China National Highway 107

Places of interest

 Liaodi Pagoda: The tallest existing pre-modern Chinese pagoda
 Dingzhou Confucius Temple: A well-preserved Confucius temple in Hebei

See also
 Shengyou, a village in Dingzhou

References

Citations

Bibliography
 Sidney D. Gamble, Foreword by Y.C. James Yen. Field work directed by Franklin Ching-han Lee. Ting Hsien, a North China Rural Community  (New York: International Secretariat Institute of Pacific Relations,  1954; rpr Stanford University Press, 1968). xxv, 472p.  54009009. Sociological survey conducted in the 1920s and early 1930s.

External links 

 Dingzhou City Government Website
 Report on excavation of Dingzhou tombs

 

 
Geography of Baoding
County-level cities in Hebei